Winckworth is an English given and family name. Notable people include:

Surname
 Ronald Winckworth (1884-1950), British natural historian
 William Winckworth (born 1870), English footballer

Given name
 Winckworth Allan Gay (1821–1910), American landscape artist
 Winckworth Tonge (1727-1792), Canadian soldier, land owner and political figure